

The Hiller VXT-8 Coleopter was a proposed annular wing VTOL aircraft designed in the United States in the late 1950s, inspired by the French SNECMA Coléoptère. The project did not progress beyond the mockup stage.

External links
 Smithsonian Air and Space Museum site about the involvement of Stanley Hiller in the development of the Coleopter

Annular-wing aircraft
VXT-8
1950s United States experimental aircraft
Tailsitter aircraft